Weird-Ohs is a computer-animated television series produced by Decode Entertainment, Mainframe Entertainment and EM.TV in association with the Testors Corporation. The show was originally aired in 1999 until 2000 on Fox Family (now Freeform) in the United States and YTV in Canada. Only 13 episodes of the series were ever produced (with one season).

Synopsis
The show that focused on deformed characters and their misadventures in Weirdsville, a place just off Route 66. It was based on a popular toy line, and featured two anthro teenagers, Portia and Eddie, living in a world populated with talking cars.

Production
The concept and characters were based on the Weird-Ohs series of polystyrene model kits by the Hawk Company. The characters in the model kits were popular in the early 1960s as satire on America's car culture.

Honours
In 2000, the show was nominated for a Gemini award.

Characters
Digger (voiced by Kathleen Barr): Portia's brother.
Eddie (voiced by Cusse Mankuma): Digger's best friend.
Portia (voiced by Tabitha St. Germain): Digger's older sister.
Daddy-O Chassis (voiced by Scott McNeil): Digger and Portia's teacher at their school.
Mama-B Chassis (voiced by Kathleen Barr): Daddy-O's wife. She owns Mama-B's Diner. Her voice is an imitation of actress Katharine Hepburn.
Baby Chassis (voiced by Ian James Corlett): Daddy-O and Mama-B's infant son.
Davey (voiced by Scott McNeil): A biker and Portia's crush, who doesn't notice her. He loves his motorcycle.
Wade (voiced by Ian James Corlett): A snobby rich kid and Digger's rival. Wade has a crush on Portia, who doesn't reciprocate his feelings.
Killer McBash (voiced by Scott McNeil): Wade's bodyguard/valet/driver.
Leaky Boat Louie (voiced by Mark Acheson): A big sailor guy who has different jobs, similar to Hollywood from 2 Stupid Dogs.
Uncle Huey (voiced by Garry Chalk): A hillbilly driving a car similar to the Arkansas Chuggabug 8 from Hanna-Barbera's Wacky Races. He has a pet crocodile/alligator named Carry-On.
Slingrave Curvette (voiced by Elizabeth Carol Savenkoff): A one-time substitute teacher and later principal. She makes occasional appearances as a Vanna White-like game show co-host/model.

Episodes
At one point, the show was considered lost media and only a few segments have been found. But now there are a few more episodes available.

Telecast and home media
Weird-Oh's was originally aired in 1999 until 2002 on Fox Family (now Freeform) in the United States and YTV in Canada (with repeats until the mid-2000s). The show was released in 2000 as a set of three videotapes by ADV Films titled "Lights, Camera, Traction", "Wheel Trouble", and "Traffic Jam". YTV released the entire series on DVD in 2005. These items were never published in large quantities and remain rare. As of 2022, the show was uploaded on YouTube (with full episodes).

References

External links

1990s American animated television series
1990s Canadian animated television series
2000s American animated television series
2000s Canadian animated television series
1999 American television series debuts
2000 American television series endings
1999 Canadian television series debuts
2000 Canadian television series endings
American children's animated comedy television series
Canadian children's animated comedy television series
Fox Family Channel original programming
YTV (Canadian TV channel) original programming
American computer-animated television series
Canadian computer-animated television series
Works about cars
English-language television shows
Television series by Rainmaker Studios
Television series by DHX Media